Ismaël Isaac (born Kaba Diakité Issiaka in 1966) is a reggae singer from Côte d'Ivoire. Born in Abidjan, his parents are from Ponondougou in the north of the country. He is strongly influenced by Bob Marley and Alpha Blondy.

He was discovered on the Ivorian television show First Chance broadcast on Radio Television Ivoirienne and was found by the keyboardist Georges Kouakou. Its success led him to have a record contract with Island Records, and "Taxi Jump" was released in 1993.

In August 2014, Ismael came back after 14 years with his new album called "Je reste" produced by Canta Productions with some featuring from Mokobe and Bony RAS.

Discography 
       
 1986 – Tchilaba
 1989 – Yatiman
 1990 – Rahman
 1993 – Taxi Jump
 1997 – Treich Feeling (Back in Stock)
 2000 – Black System
 2014 – Je reste

References

External links 
 Reggae 2007

20th-century Ivorian male singers
1966 births
Living people
Ivorian reggae musicians
People from Abidjan